Eustathius or Eustathios (Greek Εὐστάθιος) is a Greek masculine given name, in English rendered Eustace. It may refer to:

 Saint Eustace, martyr (d. 118)
 Eustathius of Antioch, Patriarch of Antioch (c. 320 – c. 330)
 Eustathius of Sebaste, Bishop of Sebastia in Armenia (fl. 350)
 Eustathius of Cappadocia (4th century) Neoplatonist, orator, and diplomat
 Eustathius (consul), Roman consul in 421
 Eustathius of Mtskheta (died 551), Georgian saint 
 Eustathius of Epiphania, sixth-century Byzantine historian
 Eustathios (governor of the Cibyrrhaeot Theme), Byzantine governor (fl. ca. 910)
 Eustathios Maleinos (fl. 960s–980s), Byzantine general and magnate
 Eustathios Rhomaios (c. 970–1030), Byzantine jurist
 Eustathios Daphnomeles (fl. early 11th century), Byzantine general
 Patriarch Eustathius of Constantinople from 1019 to 1025
 Eustathios Palatinos (fl. mid-11th century), Byzantine Catepan of Italy
 Eustathios Kymineianos (1087–1107), Byzantine eunuch
 Eustathios Makrembolites (fl. late 12th century), Byzantine novelist
 Eustathius of Thessalonica (fl. late 12th century), bishop famous for his commentaries on Homer
 Ewostatewos, Ethiopian saint (c. 1273–c. 1352)
 Jevstatije I (fl. late 13th century), Serbian saint
 Jevstatije II (fl. ), Serbian saint

See also 
 Eustace
 Ostap

Greek masculine given names

ru:Евстафий